M'Rara is a town and commune in Djamaa District, El Oued Province, Algeria. According to the 2008 census it has a population of 7,999, up from 5,976 in 1998, with an annual growth rate of 3.0%.

Climate

M'Rara has a hot desert climate (Köppen climate classification BWh), with very hot summers and mild winters, and very little precipitation throughout the year.

Transportation

The main road out of M'Rara to the east joins the N3 highway at Djamaa. The N3 connects Biskra in the north to Touggourt in the south.

Education

3.2% of the population has a tertiary education, and another 10.5% has completed secondary education. The overall literacy rate is 64.3%, and is 73.1% among males and 55.0% among females.

Localities
The commune of M'Rara is composed of one locality:

M'Rara

References

Neighbouring towns and cities

Communes of El Oued Province